Infinite Dissolution is an album from the drone rock band Locrian. It was released on July 24, 2015, through Relapse Records.

The first single off the album, "An Index of Air" was released digitally on June 1, 2015. Locrian released a music video directed by Raymond Salvatore Harmon for the track “Arc of Extinction” on July 29, 2015, through NPR.

Background
Infinite Dissolution was announced on May 21, 2015, and the press release of the album describes it as a concept record “dealing with the struggle of human extinction.”

The group took inspiration for the album from Elizabeth Kolbert’s study of mass extinction and climate change, The Sixth Extinction.

Reception
The album generally received favorable responses from critics and fans alike. Pitchfork Media gave the album a positive review, rating the album at 8.2 out of 10 and praising the album as being the group’s “most adventurous and accessible” album yes from the “once-prohibitively esoteric” group. Consequence of Sound gave the album a B and compared looking into the photo of sculptor David Altmejd’s The Eye on the album’s cover was like “peering into the world of the album: as mesmerizing as it is disorienting.” NPR's Lars Gotrich stated that the trio “is at the height of its holistic metallic powers on Infinite Dissolution.” PopMatters gave the album 7 out of 10 stars and called the release thoughtful and dynamic and generally praised the release. Exclaim gave the album an 8 out of 10 review ending their review by stating that “Infinite Dissolution is full of haunted love songs between a fallen city and the ghosts that inhabit it; it fills a void that I never knew existed until this unsettling, aching sound poured in.”

The album currently has a score of 83 on Metacritic, indicating “universal acclaim.”

Jason Heller of the A.V. Club ranked Infinite Dissolution as his top album of 2015.

Track listing

Personnel
Credits adapted from Allmusic.

Drone
André Foisy – guitar, electronics
Terence Hannum – synthesizer (Moog Little Phatty, Moog Minitaur, Moog Source, MicroKorg, ARP Avatar, EDP Wasp, Mellotron M400), sampler
Steven Hess – drums, percussion, electronics 
Erica Burgner - vocals 
Dana Schecter - lap steel guitar

Production
Greg Norman – recording and mixing at Electrical Audio
David Altmejd – artwork
Jacob Speis – layout

References

External links 
 

2015 albums
Locrian (band) albums
Relapse Records albums